The filmography and discography of Brian Volk-Weiss consists of numerous stand-up specials, comedy albums, films, and television shows. Volk-Weiss has largely acted as a producer or executive producer on these projects in his role as CEO of the production and distribution company, Comedy Dynamics. He has also directed select stand-up specials and television episodes, including those for his own Netflix series, The Toys That Made Us. Over the course of his career, Volk-Weiss has served as a producer for comedy albums and stand-up specials for many comedians, including Jim Gaffigan, Kevin Hart, Ali Wong, Tom Segura, Marc Maron, Doug Stanhope, D.L. Hughley, Bob Saget, Tiffany Haddish, Bill Burr, Brian Posehn, Mike Birbiglia, Kathleen Madigan, and numerous others. Two comedy albums he has produced (Louis C.K.: Live at Madison Square Garden and Dave Chappelle's The Age of Spin & Deep in the Heart of Texas) have gone on to win the Grammy Award for Best Comedy Album.

Filmography

Director

Producer

Film

Television

Stand-up specials

Discography

Comedy albums

References

External links
Comedy Dynamics website

Production discographies
Comedian discographies
American filmographies
Director filmographies